The 1895–96 City Cup was the second edition of the City Cup, a cup competition in Irish football.

The tournament was won by Linfield for the second time and second consecutive year. They defeated Distillery 2–1 in a test match replay after both teams finished level on points in the table, and after the first test match to decide the winner ended in a draw.

Group standings

Test match

Replay

References

1895–96 in Irish association football